Pieter Johannes van Rhijn (24 March 1886 – 9 May 1960) was a Dutch astronomer.  Born in Gouda, he studied at Groningen.  He served as director at the Sterrenkundig Laboratorium (Kapteyn Astronomical Institute) in Groningen.

He died in Groningen. The crater van Rhijn on the Moon is named after him, as is asteroid 2203 van Rhijn.

Sources
Stamboom geslacht Van Rhijn (Dutch language source) 
Biografie van Rhijn, Pieter Johannes van (Dutch language source)

20th-century Dutch astronomers
1886 births
1960 deaths
People from Gouda, South Holland
Academic staff of the University of Groningen